State Route 56 (SR 56) is a  state highway completely within Washington County in the southwestern part of the U.S. state of Alabama. The western terminus of the highway is at the Mississippi state line at an intersection with U.S. Route 45 (US 45) and Mississippi Highway 42 (MS 42). The eastern terminus of the highway is at Wagarville, where it intersects US 43.

SR 56 was part of US 84 until 1958, when the Coffeeville Bridge opened over the Tombigbee River.

Route description

SR 56 enters Alabama at the Mississippi state line where Mississippi Highway 42 intersects US 45. The highway heads eastward as it approached Chatom, the county seat of Washington County. East of Chatom, the highway travels through rural areas until it reaches its eastern terminus at US 43 in Wagarville. The highway is aligned along a two-lane road for its entirety.

History

Major intersections

See also

References

056
Transportation in Washington County, Alabama
U.S. Route 84